Fame Gurukul was an Indian reality show on Sony Entertainment Television which premiered on 27 June 2005. The  program was produced by the same production house of Indian Idol. The concept of the show was to select a pair of India's best singers/performers.

It is based on the Spanish Operación Triunfo and international Star Academy format of Endemol, better known in English under the UK title Fame Academy; in Indian terms, it was essentially a mixture of Indian Idol and Big Brother TV shows. Fame Gurukul started out with 16 contestants living in a musical performance academy (Gurukul). Every week (normally) one contestant was voted out of the show, and so on until two remained in the end.

Prizes
The finalists received a Rs.1 crore music contract from Sony in addition to a Maruti Alto car each.

Season one

Contestants
 Qazi Touqeer (Winner)
 Ruprekha Banerjee (Winner)
 Rex D'Souza Runner Up
 Arpita Mukherjee
 Sandeep Batraa
 Arijit Singh
 Monica Gadgil
 Shamit Tyagi
 Keerthi Sagathia
 Mona Bhatt
 Ravi Tripathi
 Anubhav Suman
 Gurpreet Kaur
 Amit Jadhav
 Chhavi Sodhani
 Deepshikha Sharma
 Deepak Singh Meher

Faculty

Head Mistress
 Ila Arun

Music
 Padma Wadkar
 Prasant A Samadhar

Dance
 Caesar Gonsalves

Fitness
Deepika Mehta

Judges

Jury Members
 Javed Akhtar -  Lyricist / Screenplay writer / Poet
 KK (Krishnakumar Kunnath) - Singer
 Shankar Mahadevan - Singer / Composer

Celebrity Judges
Occasionally a celebrity judge was called on the show to comment on the performances and to inspire the singers. The following was a list of special judges who appeared on Fame Gurukul:
Karan Johar
Bipasha Basu and John Abraham
Diya Mirza
Anil Kapoor
Alka Yagnik
Madhavan
Shreya Ghoshal
Alisha Chinoy
Aftab Shivdasani
Bhumika Chawla
Sarika
Neha Dhupia

Presenters
 Mandira Bedi
 Manav Gohil

TV Production

 Manav Dhanda - Creative Director & Project Head
 Anupama Mandloi - Executive Producer, Sony Entertainment Television India
 Paul Coueslant - Consultant Executive Producer, Endemol International
 Nikhil Alva - Series Producer, Miditech

Results

On 20 October 2005, the final show of Fame Gurukul was broadcast in which the final three contestants - Qazi Touqeer, Rex D'Souza and Ruprekha Banerjee battled it for the top spots.
After much waiting and various shows in between, the results were finally announced. Qazi Touqeer, the favourite was one of the winners, while Ruprekha Banerjee made up the pair with him.

Celebrity Fame Gurukul
After the claimed success of Fame Gurukul, Sony Entertainment Television brought what they claimed to be "a bigger, better, more exciting and entertaining" version of Fame Gurukul named Celebrity Fame Gurukul where now was the turn of some popular personalities to compete by going "back to school". Celebrity Fame Gurukul is based on the successful reality show called 'Comic Relief Does Fame Academy' which was a spin-off on 'Fame Academy' produced by the format owner Gestmusic, part of the Endemol Group.

They were now given various tasks to learn becoming singers and performers, while competing for the grand prize.

The show promised unlimited drama and excitement while watching the never-before-seen footage of the behind-the-scenes action and drama of the highly diverse group of celebrities, their behaviour, quirks, egos, trials, tribulations, inter-personal relationship, competitive spirit and their struggle to survive at the Gurukul uncensored, unscripted and very candid. And, for the very first time ever, viewers got to watch the celebrities in their new 'avataar' - as singers.

The proceeds of the show would go to the Make a Wish Foundation, a non-profit organization dedicated to granting the most cherished wishes of children living with life-threatening illnesses.

Making of the Fame Singer

After receiving close to 50 million votes, Celebrity Fame Gurukul took the popularity of the show to new heights. The television celebrities who were all non-singers now trained together and competed at the Gurukul - where discipline and their raw talent would be professionally tested by the well-known team of Ila Arun, Prasant Samadar, Padma Wadkar and Bosco-Caesar.

The format once again allowed votes by the faculty, contestants as well as viewers who would ultimately decide the best singer and performer out of the nine television personalities, spiced up with entertaining musical performances, gripping drama and high emotions entertaining the viewers.

Contestants
 Ajay Gehi
 Amit Sareen
 Bakhtiyaar Irani
 Bobby Darling
 Jayati Bhatia
 Smita Bansal
 Utkarsh Sharma
 Tanaaz Currim
 Tisca Chopra
 Vinod Singh
 Hansika Motwani
 Ashutosh Jain

Amit Sareen finished winner, with Vinod Singh as 1st runner-up and Tanaaz Currim as 2nd runner-up.

Judges 
Javed Akhtar
Alka Yagnik
KK
Shankar Mahadevan

See also
 Fame Gurukul contestants

References

External links
 Official website
 Celebrity Fame Gurukul Official website

Indian reality television series
Sony Entertainment Television original programming
2005 Indian television series debuts
2005 Indian television series endings
Star Academy
Indian television series based on non-Indian television series